Magnolia is a city in Columbia County, Arkansas, United States. As of the 2010 census the population was 11,577. The city is the county seat of Columbia County.

Magnolia is home to the World's Largest Charcoal Grill and the World Championship Steak Cookoff, part of the Magnolia Blossom Festival.

History
The city was founded in 1853. At the time of its incorporation in 1858, the city had a population of about 1,950. African-American man, Jordan Jameson was lynched on November 11, 1919, in the town square of Magnolia. A large white mob seized Jameson after he allegedly shot the local sheriff. They tied him to a stake and burned him alive. The city grew slowly as an agricultural and regional cotton market until the discovery of oil just east of the city in March 1938, with the Barnett #1 drilled by the Kerr-Lynn Company. The Magnolia Oil Field was an important discovery for the city as well as for the nation, as it was the largest producing field (in volume) during the early years of World War II, helping to sustain the American war effort.

In March 2013, more than 5,000 barrels of oil leaked from a Lion Oil Trading & Transportation storage tank in Magnolia, with some flowing into a bayou.

Geography
Magnolia is located in southwest Arkansas, north of the center of Columbia County at  (33.274052, -93.233477). The surrounding region is a mix of dense forest, farm prairies, and low rolling hills.

Climate
The winters are mild but can dip into the teens at night and have highs in the 30s and even some 20s but average out around 50. The springs are warm and can be stormy with strong to severe storms and average highs in the mid 70s. Summers are often hot, humid and dry but with occasional isolated afternoon storms, highs in the mid to upper 90s and even 100s. In the fall the temps cool from the 90s and 100s to 80s and 70s. Early fall temps are usually in the 80s but can reach 90s and at times has reached 100. Late fall temps fall to 70s and 60s. It is not uncommon to see snow and ice during the winter. It has been known to snow a few times as late as April and as early as November in Magnolia .

Demographics

2020 census

As of the 2020 United States census, there were 11,162 people, 3,935 households, and 2,338 families residing in the city.

2000 census
As of the census of 2000, there were 10,858 people, 4,204 households, and 2,577 families residing in the city. The racial makeup of the city was 58.24% White, 39.38% Black or African American, 0.22% Native American, 0.65% Asian, 0.02% Pacific Islander, 0.48% from other races, and 1.00% from two or more races. Hispanic or Latino of any race were 1.07% of the population.

There were 4,204 households, out of which 28.6% had children under the age of 18 living with them, 40.2% were married couples living together, 17.9% had a female householder with no husband present, and 38.7% were non-families. Of 4,204 households, 101 are unmarried partner households: 91 heterosexual, 4 same-sex male, 6 same-sex female households.  34.6% of all households were made up of individuals, and 16.6% had someone living alone who was 65 years of age or older.  The average household size was 2.33 and the average family size was 3.01.

In the city, the population was spread out, with 24.2% under the age of 18, 16.8% from 18 to 24, 23.1% from 25 to 44, 18.4% from 45 to 64, and 17.5% who were 65 years of age or older.  The median age was 33 years. For every 100 females, there were 84.8 males.  For every 100 females age 18 and over, there were 79.4 males.

The median income for a household in the city was $29,897, as of 2005, and the median income for a family was $35,269. Males had a median income of $31,577 versus $20,840 for females. The per capita income for the city was $15,403.  About 15.2% of families and 23.0% of the population were below the poverty line, including 32.9% of those under age 18 and 17.7% of those age 65 or over.

Economy
Magnolia when it was founded was a cotton, farm production, and marketing town. Slowly the town grew, and in 1909 the Third District Agricultural School, subsequently known as Magnolia A&M and Southern State College, now known as Southern Arkansas University, was founded. During World War II Magnolia became a heavy manufacturing city. In 1938 oil and natural gas were discovered near the city in what was called the Magnolia Oil Field, the largest producing field by volume in the nation during the war. The city soon became a producer in steel, lumber, aluminum, bromine, rubber-coated products and fuel cells for the military.

The town's primary economic focus is heavy industrial, including Albemarle Corporation's Bromine Products Division (which has two facilities near town), Amfuel (which produces fuel cells for the military), and Sapa Group's extruded aluminum products facility. Also located in the area are several oil and brine drilling companies, many of which are locally owned, and timber companies, such as Deltic and Weyerhaeuser.

Major industrial employers: SAPA (750), Albemarle (739), Amfuel (380), CMC (344), Weyerhaeuser (250), Deltic Timber (125), Partee Flooring (95), and Southern Aluminum (90).

Largest non-manufacturing employers: 
Magnolia Public School System, 346
Southern Arkansas University, 304
Magnolia Hospital, 253
Columbia County government, 110

The unemployment rate in Magnolia is 9.40%, with job growth of -0.40%. Future job growth over the next ten years is predicted to be 29.70%, according to Sterling's, The U.S. unemployment rate average for the month of June is 9.2%, Arkansas' average is 7.2%.

Arts and culture 
Magnolia is home to the Magnolia Blossom Festival and World Championship Steak Cookoff. The festival has been featured on the Food Network and attracts more than 40,000. A 'Festival of Lights' is held from late November through late December.

Magnolia is known locally for its downtown shopping on the square and for its murals - one of which was signed by Charlton Heston.

Government
The city operated under a city council form of government until 2003. Voters elected to convert the city to a strong-mayor form of government, making the mayor's position a full-time position with veto power. Lane Jean was elected mayor in 1996.<ref>Magnolia, Ark., Elected Officials. Retrieved December 23, 2010. </ref> The city employs approximately 50 individuals in seven different departments, including the Police Department, the Fire Department, and Parks and Recreation.

 Animal shelter rescue 
The city operated a shelter designed for approximately 20 dogs. On August 14, 2014, this facility was found to have 59 dogs in unclean conditions, without heat, air conditioning or even walls for the animals. With the city's permission, the local H&P Animal Alliance assisted in removing the dogs from the over-crowded shelter.

A number of dogs were sent to an out-of-state animal rescue group specializing in saving large-breed working dogs, Big Fluffy Dog Rescue. Big Fluffy Dog Rescue is a Nashville, Tennessee-based 501(c)(3) not-for-profit organization. The rescue effort cost an uncompensated $50,000.

Education

Public and private schools
Public schools in the Magnolia School District include:

 Walker Pre-K Center (PK)
 Magnolia Eastside Elementary (K-3)
 Magnolia Central Elementary (4-6)
 Magnolia Junior High School (7-9)
 Magnolia High School (10-12)

Private schools in Magnolia include:

 Columbia Christian School

Magnolia High School is known for its boys' track teams and baseball program. The track team has won the State Championship five out of the last six years. The Panther baseball team was crowned State Champions in 2011 and have won four straight conference titles. The Magnolia Panthers compete in the Arkansas Activities Association 5A-Southwest conference.

Since 1999 Magnolia High School graduates have received well over $1 million in college scholarship money each year, with the class of 2008 being first to reach $2 million in scholarship offers.

Graduation rates for the city are: High school or higher, 75.4%; Bachelor's degree or higher, 24.1%; Graduate or professional degree, 7.0%.

Colleges and universities
Magnolia is the home of Southern Arkansas University, a public university that offers four-year and advanced (Master's level) degrees in business, public administration, computer information systems, education, counseling, education administration, and criminal justice. With an enrollment of 4,771, its most notable programs are agriculture, business, and education. The university's cultural focus is Harton Theatre, which provides a venue for both departmental plays, concerts, and local cultural events.

Infrastructure

Airport
Magnolia Municipal Airport is a city-owned, public-use airport located three nautical miles (6 km) southeast of the central business district of Magnolia.

Highways
 U.S. Highway 82
 U.S. Highway 79
 U.S. Highway 371
 Arkansas Highway 19
 Arkansas Highway 355
 U.S. Highway 82 Business
 U.S. Highway 79 Business

Photo gallery

Notable people

Harvey C. Couch (1877-1941), Arkansas entrepreneur who controlled a regional utility and railroad empire; raised in Magnolia
Billy Joe Daugherty (1952–2009), founder and pastor of Victory Christian Center in Tulsa, Oklahoma
Roy Green, former wide receiver in the National Football League who played for the St. Louis Cardinals (1979–1987), Phoenix Cardinals (1988–1990) and Philadelphia Eagles (1991–1992); born in Magnolia
Charlaine Harris, New York Times bestselling author who writes what are referred to as the Sookie Stackhouse novels collected in The Southern Vampire Mysteries, the basis for the HBO show True Blood''; lived in Magnolia
Lane Jean (born c. 1959), former mayor of Magnolia and current Republican member of the Arkansas House of Representatives from Columbia, Lafayette, and Miller counties
Andrew R. Johnson (1856–1933), Louisiana state senator from 1916–1924 and mayor of Homer; taught school near Magnolia in the 1890s
Sidney Sanders McMath (1912-2003), governor of Arkansas (1949-1953), Major General, U.S. Marine Corps Reserve (1965-1970) & leading U.S. trial lawyer. 
Mike Runnels (1945-2015), Lieutenant Governor of New Mexico
Horace M. Wade, former U.S. Air Force general, served as chief of staff, Supreme Headquarters Allied Powers Europe, vice-chief of staff, U.S. Air Force; born in Magnolia 1916; died 2001.
Carl Wafer, former defensive end in the National Football League who played for the New York Giants and Green Bay Packers in 1974; born in Magnolia

Annexation
The city was expected to receive between $60,000 to $70,000 in state turnbacks per year as a result.

References

 - Total pages: 368

External links

 
 City of Magnolia official website
 Magnolia Chamber of Commerce
 Magnolia Blossom Festival
 City-Data.com
 Magnolia School District
 Magnolia High School
 Big Fluffy Dog Rescue
 H&P Animal Alliance

Cities in Arkansas
Cities in Columbia County, Arkansas
Micropolitan areas of Arkansas
County seats in Arkansas
Populated places established in 1853
1853 establishments in Arkansas